The 2018–19 Angers SCO season was the 99th professional season of the club since its creation in 1919. During the campaign, the club competed in Ligue 1 as well as the Coupe de France and Coupe de la Ligue.

Players

Out on loan

Competitions

Ligue 1

League table

Results summary

Results by round

Matches

Coupe de France

Coupe de la Ligue

References

Angers SCO seasons
Angers SCO